14 km dorogi Kem-Kalevala is a rural locality (a settlement) in Kemskoye Urban Settlement of Kemsky District, Russia. The population was 604 as of 2013.

Geography 
It is located 13 km west of Kemi, on the shore of the Putka reservoir.

History 
Previously, it was also known as the village of Sokol, where military pilots of the 265th fighter aviation regiment of the Air Defense lived, and earlier the 828th assault aviation regiment, who served at the Poduzhemye airfield, located near the highway.

Transport 
The federal highway R21 «Kola» passes through the village.

Education and culture 
There is a Poduzhem secondary school.

Historical monuments 
A monument to the Su-15 aircraft is preserved in the village.

Gallery

References 

Rural localities in the Republic of Karelia
Kemsky District